David Carradine (born John Arthur Carradine Jr.; December 8, 1936 – June 3, 2009) was an American actor best known for playing martial arts roles. He is perhaps best known as the star of the 1970s television series Kung Fu, playing Kwai Chang Caine, a peace-loving Shaolin monk travelling through the American Old West. He also portrayed the title character in both of the Kill Bill films. He appeared in two Martin Scorsese films: Boxcar Bertha and Mean Streets.

David Carradine was a member of the Carradine family of actors that began with his father, John Carradine. The elder Carradine's acting career, which included major and minor roles on stage, television, and in cinema, spanned more than four decades. A prolific "B" movie actor, David Carradine appeared in more than 100 feature films in a career spanning more than six decades. He received nominations for a Golden Globe Award and an Emmy Award for his work on Kung Fu, and received three additional Golden Globe nominations for his performances in the Woody Guthrie biopic Bound for Glory (1976), the television miniseries North and South (1985), and Quentin Tarantino's Kill Bill: Volume 2, for which he won the Saturn Award for Best Supporting Actor.

Throughout his life, Carradine was arrested and prosecuted for a variety of offenses, which often involved substance abuse. Films that featured Carradine continued to be released after his death. These posthumous credits were from a variety of genres including action, documentaries, drama, horror, martial arts, science fiction, and westerns. In addition to his acting career, Carradine was a director and musician. Moreover, influenced by his Kung Fu role, he studied martial arts. On April 1, 1997, Carradine received a star on the Hollywood Walk of Fame.

Early life

Carradine was born John Arthur Carradine Jr. on December 8, 1936, in Hollywood, California, the eldest child of actor John Carradine (1906–1988) and his wife Ardanelle Abigail (née McCool) Carradine (1911–1989). He was a half-brother of Bruce, Keith, Christopher, and Robert Carradine, and an uncle of Ever Carradine and Martha Plimpton, most of whom are also actors. Primarily of Irish descent, he was a great-grandson of Methodist evangelical author Beverly Carradine and a grandnephew of artist Will Foster. Called "Jack" by his family, Carradine had a turbulent childhood. His parents divorced and repeatedly remarried; he was born to his mother's second marriage of three, and his father's first of four. At the time of Carradine's parents' marriage, his mother already had a son by her first husband, whom John adopted. John Carradine planned to have a large family, but after his wife had a series of miscarriages, he discovered she had gotten numerous abortions without his knowledge which had rendered her unable to carry a baby to term.

Against this backdrop of marital discord, David almost succeeded in committing suicide by hanging at the age of five. He said the incident followed his discovery that he and his elder half-brother, Bruce, who had been adopted by John, had different biological fathers. Carradine added, "My father saved me, and then confiscated my comic book collection and burned it—which was scarcely the point." After three years of marriage, Ardenelle filed for divorce from John, but they remained married for five more years. Divorce finally came in 1944, when Carradine was seven. His father left California to avoid court action in the alimony settlement. After the couple had a series of court battles over child custody and alimony, which at one point landed John in jail, David joined his father in New York City; by this time, his father had remarried. On December 25, 1947, David appeared in a live telecast adaptation of A Christmas Carol, with his father in the role of Ebenezer Scrooge. For the next few years, David spent time in boarding schools, foster homes, and reform school. He also often accompanied his father to summer theater throughout the Northeast. Carradine spent time in Massachusetts, and a winter milking cows on a farm in Vermont.

Oakland
Eventually, David Carradine returned to California, where he graduated from Oakland High School. He attended Oakland Junior College (now Laney College) for a year before transferring to San Francisco State College, where he studied drama and music theory, and wrote music for the drama department's annual revues while juggling menial jobs, a fledgling stage acting career, and his studies. After he dropped out of college, Carradine spent some time with the "beatniks" of San Francisco's North Beach and southern California's Venice. During this time he collected unemployment insurance and sold baby pictures. He was also prosecuted for disturbing the peace.

Army service
Despite an attempt to dodge the draft, in 1960 Carradine was inducted into the United States Army, where he drew pictures for training aids. That Christmas he married his high school sweetheart, Donna Lee Becht. While stationed at Fort Eustis, Virginia, he helped establish a theater company that became known as the "entertainment unit". He met fellow inductee Larry Cohen, who later cast him in Q, The Winged Serpent. He also faced court-martial for shoplifting. In 1962, Donna gave birth to their daughter, Calista. Carradine was honorably discharged after two years of active duty.

Film and television career

Early TV and film appearances

Upon leaving the Army, Carradine became serious about acting. He was advised to change his name to avoid confusion with his famous father. In an interview from 2005 Carradine says his father encouraged him going into acting: "The first thing I ever did outside of school, which was a production of Romeo & Juliet, he came up from Hollywood to San Francisco to see it. And right after he just sort of opened up to me with all this advice. He became very proud of me."

In 1963, he made his television debut on an episode of Armstrong Circle Theatre, "Secret Document X256". Several other television roles followed, including appearances on Wagon Train, East Side/West Side, Arrest and Trial, The Virginian, Bob Hope Presents the Chrysler Theatre and The Alfred Hitchcock Hour. In 1964 Carradine appeared as "The Utah Kid" on The Virginian in the episode "The Intruders." Carradine got a contract with Universal. The studio gave him his feature film debut in Taggart (1964), a western based on a Louis L'Amour novel. It also cast him in Bus Riley's Back in Town (1965).

In May 1964, Carradine joined the cast of the Broadway play The Deputy by Rolf Hochhuth, replacing Jeremy Brett. When the play ended he was still under contract to Universal, and resumed TV work. He spent a lot of time playing, in his words, "greenhorns in Westerns and villains in thrillers".  Carradine guest-starred in The Trials of O'Brien in episodes that were cut together and released theatrically as Too Many Thieves (1967), and Coronet Blue.

The Royal Hunt of the Sun
Carradine's first big break came with his second Broadway part in The Royal Hunt of the Sun, a play by Peter Shaffer about the destruction of the Inca civilization by conquistador Francisco Pizarro. Carradine played Atahuallpa opposite Christopher Plummer as Pizarro. The play premiered in October 1965 and was a solid hit, running for 261 performances. Carradine said of this performance, "Many of the important roles that I got later on were because the guy who was going to hire me was in that audience and had his mind blown." For that part, Carradine won a Theatre World Award for Best Debut Performance in 1965. He was also named as one of Theatre World's Promising Personalities from Broadway and Off Broadway. (The play was filmed in 1968 with Plummer taking Carradine's part.)

Shane and supporting actor
Carradine left the production of Royal Hunt of the Sun in May 1966 to take up an offer to star in the TV series Shane, a 1966 western based upon a 1949 novel of the same name, previously filmed in 1953. Carradine played the title role opposite Jill Ireland. "I know I have some kind of vision that most actors and directors don't have", he said, "so it becomes a duty to exercise that vision. It's a responsibility, a mission." The show only lasted 17 episodes, despite good reviews. Carradine said his career was "rescued" when he was cast in Johnny Belinda (1967). He was in demand as a supporting actor, mostly in Westerns: The Violent Ones (1967), Heaven with a Gun (1969), Young Billy Young (1969) for Burt Kennedy, The Good Guys and the Bad Guys (1969) with Kennedy, The McMasters (1970), and Macho Callahan (1970).

In 1969, he performed off-Broadway in The Transgressor Rides Again, and the next year guest-starred in The Name of the Game. Carradine guest-starred opposite David McCallum in a 1971 episode of Night Gallery, "The Phantom Farmhouse". Also that year, Carradine played a hippie reprobate opposite Sally Field in the well-received television movie Maybe I'll Come Home in the Spring. He also guest-starred in episodes of Gunsmoke and Ironside. He was unhappy playing villains, and told his agent he wanted to stop, which led to his not working in Hollywood for a year. He was cast in a musical, The Ballad of Johnny Pot, but fired two days before opening night on Broadway.

Boxcar Bertha
In 1972, he co-starred as "Big" Bill Shelly in one of Martin Scorsese's earliest films, Boxcar Bertha, which starred Barbara Hershey, his partner at the time. This was one of several Roger Corman productions in which he appeared. It was also one of a handful of acting collaborations he did with his father. He made his feature directorial debut with the film You and Me, starring alongside Hershey and his brothers Keith and Robert. It was shot in 1972, between making the Kung Fu pilot and the series, but released in 1975.

Kung Fu

For three seasons, Carradine starred as the half-Chinese/half-White-American Shaolin monk Kwai Chang Caine in the ABC hit TV series Kung Fu (1972–1975). The role was nominated for an Emmy and a Golden Globe Award. Along with Bruce Lee movies, Kung Fu helped to popularize the martial arts and Eastern philosophy in the west. Carradine's character also brought the term "grasshopper" (referring to an apprentice) into popular culture.

Although the choice of a non-Asian to play the role of Kwai Chang Caine stirred controversy, the show provided steady employment for a number of Asian-American actors. In addition to Keye Luke and Philip Ahn, who held leading roles in the cast as Caine's Shaolin masters, Robert Ito, James Hong, Benson Fong, Richard Loo, and Victor Sen Yung frequently appeared in the series. A second controversy was over whose idea the series had been. Bruce Lee's widow claimed he had come up with the idea of a wandering monk in the Old West, but Ed Spielman, the series' creator, insisted that the concept was his own idea from years before Lee became a star. In an interview from 2005 Carradine disputed Bruce Lee's claim: "That's mythology. I think the way that story started was that they got it mixed up with The Silent Flute. Not sure how that happened." In his authoritative biography Bruce Lee: A Life, Matthew Polly clarifies the issue of Bruce Lee's involvement, concluding that the claim was the result of his not being cast for the leading role, and that he had no participation in the creation of the series. 

Kung Fu ended due to several factors. It has been said that Carradine left the show after sustaining injuries that made it impossible for him to continue. While Carradine mentioned it when talking about his work in film, other causes involved were Carradine’s burnout, changes in the writing and shooting that altered the show's quality, and changes in the time slot, which led to the audience’s decline; finally, the main reason was Carradine’s decision to quit to pursue a career as a film actor and filmmaker. Also, the bad publicity that the 1974 peyote-related incident attracted on him affected the ratings in a way that Radames Pera described as sabotage, and that Carradine himself acknowledged had been detrimental to them. 

During Kung Fu'''s original run, Carradine made cameo appearances in Scorsese's Mean Streets (1973) (alongside his brother Robert Carradine) and Robert Altman's The Long Goodbye. He also directed several episodes of Kung Fu, a short musical called A Country Mile (1973), and a film, Around. Carradine's annual salary on the show was reportedly $100,000."Carradine Fined, Given Probation: Kung Fu Star Pleads No Contest to Mischief Charge". Farr, William; Los Angeles Times, November 13, 1974: 3.

Film stardom

Immediately after Kung Fu, Carradine accepted the role of the racecar driver Frankenstein in Death Race 2000 (1975), he said, to "kill the image of Caine and launch a movie career." The role had originally been offered to Peter Fonda, who was not available. The film, directed by Paul Bartel and produced by Roger Corman, became a cult classic for New World Pictures. Carradine got 10% of the profits and made significant money from it. Carradine was tapped to play Duke Leto Atreides in Alejandro Jodorowsky's aborted Dune adaptation in the late 1970s. Carradine starred in the 1975 TV movie Long Way Home and another car chase film for Bartel and New World, Cannonball! (1976). Also in 1976, he earned critical praise for his portrayal of folksinger Woody Guthrie in Hal Ashby's Bound for Glory, for which he won a National Board of Review Award for Best Actor and was nominated for a Golden Globe Award and New York Film Critics Circle Award. Carradine worked very closely with his friend, singer-songwriter-guitarist Guthrie Thomas, on the film. Thomas assisted Carradine in the guitar style of the period and the songs that had been chosen to be in the film.

Carradine made a third car chase film for Corman, Thunder and Lightning, in 1977. Next came the role of the alcoholic, unemployed trapeze artist Abel Rosenberg in The Serpent's Egg (1977). Set in post-World War I Berlin, The Serpent's Egg, which also starred Liv Ullmann, is together with The Touch one of the two only English-language films by Swedish director Ingmar Bergman. Carradine replaced Richard Harris, who was too ill to do it. Bergman said of his leading man, "I don't believe in God, but Heaven must have sent him." Carradine said that he and Bergman had plans to collaborate further, but Bergman's affection for him waned when he passionately protested a scene that included the butchering of a horse. The altercation caused Carradine to question the fate of Bergman's soul while the director declared, "Little Brother, I am an old whore. I have shot two other horses, burned one and strangled a dog."

Back in Hollywood, Carradine co-starred with Charlton Heston in Gray Lady Down (1978) and did another film for Corman, Deathsport (1978), an unofficial sequel to Death Race 2000."Joe Levine's Path to 'Bridge'". Lee, Grant; Los Angeles Times, January 24, 1977: f6a. When Bruce Lee died in 1973, he left an unreleased movie script he had developed with James Coburn and Stirling Silliphant, The Silent Flute. The script became Circle of Iron (1978), and in the film, Carradine played the four roles originally intended for Lee. Carradine considered this among his best work.Carradine, David and Moore, Richard "Circle of Iron DVD Extra Feature Commentary" Carradine made Mr. Horn (1979) for TV, playing Tom Horn based on a script by William Goldman. After doing a fifth Corman action film, Fast Charlie... the Moonbeam Rider (1979), directed by Steve Carver, Carradine played Paul Gauguin for TV in Gauguin the Savage (1980).

In The Long Riders (1980), Carradine starred with his half-brothers Keith and Robert Carradine as the Younger Brothers. The ensemble cast included three other brother/actor groupings: Stacy and James Keach; Dennis and Randy Quaid, and Christopher and Nicholas Guest. The movie, which was about the Jesse James gang, gave Carradine, who played Cole Younger, one of his most memorable roles. Walter Hill directed. Carradine played a pilot in Cloud Dancer (1980) and was the villain in High Noon, Part II: The Return of Will Kane (1980). He did a car chase film in Africa, Safari 3000 (1980).

Americana and decline as star
Carradine returned to the director's chair with Americana (1981) (which was actually the completion of the earlier movie Around), which he also starred in, produced and edited. The film took ten years to complete due to difficulty in financing. It featured several of his friends and family members in supporting roles. It won the People's Choice Award at the Director's Fortnight at Cannes{{Disputed inline|Americana's "people's prize" at the 1981 Directors' Fortnight|date=October 2021}}, but failed to achieve critical support or adequate distribution.Honeycutt, Kurt (June 5, 2009) Carradine's "Americana" was one from the heart, Reuters He also directed the unreleased Mata Hari, an epic that starred his daughter, Calista.

Carradine guest-starred on an episode of Darkroom and starred in Larry Cohen's Q (1982). He made a cameo in Trick or Treats (1982) and was the villain in Lone Wolf McQuade (1983) with Chuck Norris. Carradine returned to guest-starring on regular TV series like The Fall Guy, Airwolf, Fox Mystery Theater and Partners in Crime. He starred in TV movies like Jealousy (1984) and The Bad Seed (1985), and was still in demand as the star of cheaper action films such as The Warrior and the Sorceress (1984) and On the Line (1984).

North and South
Carradine attracted notice in 1985 when he appeared in a major supporting role in North and South, a miniseries about the American Civil War, as the evil and abusive Justin LaMotte. He was nominated for a Golden Globe for Best Supporting Actor for his performance.

Carradine reprised his role as Caine in Kung Fu: The Movie (1986) for TV, which he also produced. It was the acting debut of Bruce Lee's son, Brandon Lee. He starred in the low-budget action film Behind Enemy Lines (1986) and reprised his role as LaMotte in North and South, Book II, telecast in May 1986.

Straight-to-video action films

Carradine continued to be in demand for action films, either aimed at the video market or for TV: Oceans of Fire (1986), Armed Response (1986) for Fred Olen Ray, The Misfit Brigade (1987), and Six Against the Rock (1987) as Bernie Coy. Carradine also guest starred on Amazing Stories and Night Heat and he was in I Saw What You Did (1988), Run for Your Life (1988), Warlords (1988) (again for Ray), Tropical Snow (1989), and The Cover Girl and the Cop (1989). He received some good reviews for Sonny Boy (1989), on which he sang on the soundtrack. He starred in three films for Corman: Wizards of the Lost Kingdom II (1989), directed by Charles B. Griffith; Nowhere to Run (1989), directed by Carl Franklin; and Crime Zone (1990) directed by Luis Llosa; Carradine co produced the latter. He was also in Sundown: The Vampire in Retreat (1989), directed by Anthony Hickox; Try This One for Size (1989), Open Fire (1989), and Future Force (1989), which he helped produce.

In 1989 he starred in the low-budget direct-to-video Swedish action movie The Mad Bunch directed by Mats Helge Olsson, making him one of three actors (including Heinz Hopf and Tor Isedal) who have starred in both an Ingmar Bergman movie and an Olsson movie. He followed it with Night Children (1989), Crime of Crimes (1989) (which he produced), Animal Protector (1989), Dune Warriors (1990), Martial Law (1990) and The Trace of Lynx (1990). Carradine made his first studio film in a long time with Bird on a Wire (1990) and he guest starred on shows like Matlock, The Young Riders, and The Ray Bradbury Theatre. However he predominantly worked as the star of straight to video action films: Future Zone (1990), a sequel to Future Force, Fatal Secret (1990), Midnight Fear (1991), Project Eliminator (1991) (which he helped produce), Deadly Surveillance (1991), and Brotherhood of the Gun (1991).

Carradine had support roles in The Gambler Returns: The Luck of the Draw (1991) and could be seen in Capital Punishment (1991) and Karate Cop (1991). Carradine was in Battle Gear (1991) and Evil Toons (1992) for Ray, and had support parts in Double Trouble (1992), Roadside Prophets (1992), Night Rhythms (1992), Waxwork II: Lost in Time (1992), and Distant Justice (1992). In a 2005 interview, Carradine talks about how there was a period where he was working as much as he could. Psychotronic Magazine gave him an award for the "Most Working Actor in the Universe". "Because I did nineteen movies in eighteen months. And they actually missed a couple!" Carradine thought it could not last. "That whole era of independent movies died. They clotted the market. I didn't know how to get out of that, so I did [the second series of Kung Fu]".

Kung Fu: The Legend Continues
Carradine returned to the part of Caine in Kung Fu: The Legend Continues (1992), which led to a new TV series that ran from 1993 to 1997, and consisted of 88 episodes. Carradine also worked as a producer and directed an episode. He starred in Kill Zone (1993), Dead Center (1993) for Steve Carver, Code... Death: Frontera Sur (1993), and Bitter End (1993). He was featured in a Lipton Tea commercial, which first aired during the broadcast of Super Bowl XXVIII. The advertisement paid tribute to The Three Stooges while satirizing his role in Kung Fu. In 1997, Carradine was awarded a star on the Hollywood Walk of Fame. The presenters played an April Fool's Day prank on him by first unveiling a star bearing the name of his brother, Robert.

When Kung Fu: The Legend Continues ended, Carradine went into Last Stand at Saber River (1997), an episode of Dr. Quinn, Medicine Woman, Lost Treasure of Dos Santos (1997), The Rage (1997), The Good Life (1997), Macon County Jail (1997), Nosferatu: The First Vampire (1997), Children of the Corn V: Fields of Terror (1998), The New Swiss Family Robinson (1998), Shepherd (1998), The Effects of Magic (1998), Kiss of a Stranger (1998), Sublet (1998), Martian Law (1998) for Hickox, Lovers and Liars (1998), Light Speed (1998), and Knocking on Death's Door (1999). In 1999, he made an appearance as the demon Tempus in the Season 1 finale episode of Charmed. He guest starred on shows such as Acapulco H.E.A.T., Just Shoot Me!, and Family Law. Carradine starred in Natural Selection (1999), Full Blast (1999), Zoo (1999), The Puzzle in the Air (1999), Dangerous Curves (2000) (starring Robert), Down 'n Dirty, Nightfall (2000), and By Dawn's Early Light (2000).

In 2001, he appeared in the episode "The Serpent" of the syndicated TV series Queen of Swords as the sword-wielding bandit El Serpiente filmed at Texas Hollywood studios in Almeria, Spain, home of many Spaghetti Westerns. Carradine was increasingly becoming a support actor in films: Largo Winch: The Heir (2001), G.O.D. (2001), Warden of Red Rock (2001), The Donor (2001), Out of the Wilderness (2001), The Defectors (2001), Wheatfield with Crows (2002) and The Outsider (2002). He guest-starred in The Nightmare Room, Jackie Chan Adventures, Titus, and King of the Hill. David also made a guest appearance in episode 11 of Lizzie McGuire as himself, which gave him an opportunity to work with his brother Robert, who played Lizzie's father in the series.

Kill Bill
Carradine enjoyed a revival of his fame when he was cast in Quentin Tarantino's sequential Kill Bill  movies, Kill Bill: Volume 1 (2003) and Kill Bill: Volume 2 (2004). Among those who thought his portrayal of Bill, the assassin extraordinaire, would earn him an Academy Award nomination was Scott Mantz of The Mediadrome, who said, "Carradine practically steals every scene he's in with confident gusto, and he gives a soulful performance that should all but ensure a spot on next year's Oscar ballot." Roger Ebert and Richard Roeper each had Kill Bill Vol. 2 on their top ten list for of Academy Awards predictions. Although the films received no notice from the Academy, Carradine did receive a Golden Globe nomination and a Saturn Award for Best Supporting Actor for his portrayal of Bill. Carradine had a good part in American Reel (2003) but the overall quality of his roles did not improve: Dead & Breakfast (2004),Last Goodbye (2004), Max Havoc: Curse of the Dragon (2004), Brothers in Arms (2005), Miracle at Sage Creek (2005), Final Move (2006), Saints Row (2006) and The Last Sect (2006). David Carradine took over hosting duties from his brother Keith on Wild West Tech on the History Channel, in 2005. The same year,  he also played both himself and the ghost of a dead man for an episode of the NBC TV show Medium. 

By 2006, he had become the spokesperson for Yellowbook, a publisher of independent telephone directories in the United States. He also appeared as Clockwork, the ghost of time, in two episodes of the animated series, Danny Phantom. He had a cameo in Epic Movie (2007) and was in Treasure Raiders (2007), How to Rob a Bank (and 10 Tips to Actually Get Away with It) (2007), Fall Down Dead (2007) (which he helped produce), Permanent Vacation (2007), and Fuego (2007). Carradine played Buckingham in a version of Richard III (2007) which he helped produce, and was in a studio film when he supported Rob Schneider in Big Stan (2007). He did another comedy Homo Erectus (2007) and was in Blizhniy Boy: The Ultimate Fighter (2007) and Hell Ride (2008), He starred in the 2008 TV movie, Kung Fu Killer, in which he played a Chinese martial arts master very similar to his Kung Fu series "Caine" persona—his character in this movie named "White Crane", and mostly referred to or addressed as "Crane", frequently pronounced in a manner that minimized the R sound.

Final years
Carradine's last performances included a role in the music video of the Jonas Brothers' song Burnin' Up (2008), Camille (2008), Last Hour (2008), Break (2008), The Golden Boys (2008), Kandisha (2008), Archie's Final Project (2009), Absolute Evil - Final Exit (2009), Road of No Return (2009) with Michael Madsen, Crank: High Voltage (2009), and Autumn (2009). 

Posthumous releases
The actor, who once received an award for being the hardest-working actor in Hollywood, still had approximately a dozen films in post-production at the time of his death in 2009. Most of these roles were cameos or small parts in independent, direct-to-DVD productions. Among them are a horror film, Dark Fields (2009); an action film, Bad Cop (2009); and a western, All Hell Broke Loose (2009); and Detention (2010), a thriller. He made one last film for Corman, Dinocroc vs. Supergator (2010) directed by Jim Wynorski. Ken Tucker, writing for Entertainment Weekly, said the film was "impeccable" and "goofy fun all the way". He was also in Six Days in Paradise (2010) with Madsen; Money to Burn (2010); Stretch (2011); Highway to Hell (2012); and The Banksters, Madoff with America (2013). 

Carradine also appeared in a minor role in Yuen Woo-ping's Chinese kung fu epic True Legend; they had first met while filming Kill Bill. Yuen eulogized Carradine on the True Legend website, describing him as a "good friend". Yuen said of Carradine: 

He appeared in the music video of the song Devil by Ours (2013), with images originally shot four years before for the unreleased short film 8 For Infinity, directed by Michael Maxxis. His final released movie was the cult independent film, Night of the Templar (2013), directed by his friend Paul Sampson, in which Carradine wielded a sword (katana) for the final time on screen. Almost like a foreshadowing, there are several peculiar and eerie references in the film that coincidentally relate to the circumstances of Carradine's untimely passing, which include auto-erotic asphyxiation. His last scene on screen ended in the following dialog: "Well, old friend, see you in the next lifetime." / "Yeah, old friends, old soul mates." / "Yes, we are." 

Carradine co-produced a full-length documentary about luthier Stuart Mossman, which has been identified as the actor's last film appearance. The Legend of Stuart Mossman: A Modern Stradivari, directed by Barry Brown, premiered at the Santa Barbara International Film Festival, in February 2010. It featured David, Keith, and Robert Carradine performing their music on Mossman guitars. Mossman had appeared with Carradine in Cloud Dancer (1980), which Brown also directed, and in The Long Riders. On the small screen, Carradine appeared in a guest spot on the television series Mental that was broadcast just days after his death. On October 3, 2009, Celebrity Ghost Stories premiered on the Biography Channel with an interview of Carradine discussing his belief that his closet was haunted by his wife's deceased previous husband. The segment, which was described as "eerie," was filmed four months before his own death.

Martial artist
Carradine knew nothing of the practice of kung fu at the time he was cast in the role of Kwai Chang Caine; instead, he relied on his experience as a dancer for the part. He also had experience in sword fighting, boxing, and street fighting on which to draw. For the first half of the original series, David Chow provided technical assistance with kung fu, followed by Kam Yuen, who became Carradine's martial arts instructor. He never considered himself a master of the art, but rather an "evangelist" of kung fu. By 2003, he had acquired enough expertise in martial arts to produce and star in several instructional videos on T'ai chi and Qigong. In 2005, Carradine visited the Shaolin Monastery in Henan, China, as part of the extra features for the third season of the Kung Fu DVDs. During his visit, the abbot, Shi Yǒngxìn, said that he recognized Carradine's important contribution to the promotion of the Shaolin Monastery and kung fu culture, to which Carradine replied, "I am happy to serve."

Music career

In addition to his acting career, Carradine was a musician. He sang and played the piano, the guitar, and the flute, among other instruments. In 1970, Carradine played one half of a flower-power beatnik duo in the season 4 Ironside episode, "The Quincunx", performing the songs "I Stepped on a Flower", "Lonesome Stranger", and "Sorrow of the Singing Tree". He recorded an album titled Grasshopper, which was released in 1975. His musical talents were often integrated into his screen performances. He performed several of Woody Guthrie's songs for the movie, Bound for Glory. For the Kung Fu series, he made flutes out of bamboo that he had planted on the Warner Brothers lot. He later made several flutes for the movie Circle of Iron, one of which he later played in Kill Bill. Carradine wrote and performed the theme songs for at least two movies that he starred in, Americana and Sonny Boy. The first line from the Sonny Boy theme, "Paint", which he wrote while filming Americana in 1973, is engraved on his headstone. He wrote and performed several songs for American Reel (2003) and wrote the score for You and Me. He and his brother, Robert, also performed with a band, the Cosmic Rescue Team (also known as Soul Dogs). The band performed primarily in small venues and at charity benefits. 

Personal life

Shortly after being drafted into the U.S. Army in 1960, Carradine proposed to Donna Lee Becht (born September 26, 1937), whom he had met when they were students at Oakland High School; they married on Christmas Day that year. She lived with him off-base when he was stationed at Fort Eustis in Virginia. In April 1962, she gave birth to their daughter Calista. After Carradine's discharge, the family lived in New York while Carradine established his acting career, appearing on Broadway in The Deputy and Royal Hunt of the Sun. The marriage dissolved in 1968, whereupon Carradine left New York and headed back to California to continue his television and film careers. 

In 1968, Carradine met actress Barbara Hershey while the two of them were working on Heaven with a Gun. The pair lived together until 1975. They appeared in other films together, including Martin Scorsese's Boxcar Bertha. In 1972, they appeared together in a nude Playboy spread, recreating some sex scenes from Boxcar Bertha. That year, Hershey gave birth to their son, Free (who, when aged nine, changed his name to Tom, much to his father's chagrin). The couple's relationship fell apart around the time of Carradine's 1974 burglary arrest, when Carradine began an affair with Season Hubley, who had guest-starred on Kung Fu. Carradine was engaged to Hubley for a time, but they never married.

In February 1977, Carradine married his second wife Linda (née Linda Anne Gilbert) in a civil ceremony in Munich, Germany, after filming The Serpent's Egg."David Carradine Marries in Munich," St. Petersburg Times (February 5, 1977) p. 9 Gilbert was previously married to Roger McGuinn of The Byrds. Their daughter, Kansas, was born in 1978. Carradine's second marriage ended in divorce, as did the two that followed. He was married to Gail Jensen from 1986 to 1997 and to Marina Anderson from 1998 to 2001. 

On December 26, 2004, Carradine married the widowed Annie Bierman (née Anne Kirstie Fraser, December 21, 1960) at the seaside Malibu home of his friend Michael Madsen. Vicki Roberts, his attorney and a longtime friend of his wife's, performed the ceremony. With this marriage he acquired three stepdaughters, Amanda Eckelberry (born 1989), Madeleine Rose (born 1995), and Olivia Juliette (born 1998) as well as a stepson, actor Max Richard Carradine (born 1998). In one of his final interviews, Carradine stated that at 71, he was still "in excellent shape", attributing it to a good diet and having a youthful circle of friends. "Everybody that I know is at least 10 or 20 years younger than I am. My wife Annie is 24 years younger than I am. My daughter asks why I don't hang with women my age and I say, 'Most of the women my age are a lot older than me!

Arrests and prosecutions
In the late 1950s, while living in San Francisco, Carradine was arrested for assaulting a police officer. He pleaded guilty to a lesser charge of disturbing the peace. While in the Army, he faced court-martial on more than one occasion for shoplifting.Bennetts, Leslie (September 4, 1975) "Children of the Stars: They do the Strangest Things," Miami News, p. 6 After he became an established actor and had changed his name to David, he was arrested in 1967 for possession of marijuana.

In 1974, at the height of his popularity in Kung Fu, Carradine was arrested again, this time for attempted burglary and malicious mischief."David Carradine Charged With Attempted Burglary in Rampage". West, Richard; Los Angeles Times, September 19, 1974. While under the influence of peyote, Carradine began wandering nude around his Laurel Canyon neighborhood. He broke into a neighbor's home, smashing a window and cutting his arm, and accosted two young women, allegedly assaulting one while asking her if she was a witch. Carradine pleaded no contest to the mischief charge and was given probation. He was never charged with assault, but the young woman sued him for $1.1 million and was awarded $20,000.

In 1980, while in South Africa filming Safari 3000 (also known as Rally), which co-starred Stockard Channing, Carradine was arrested for possession of marijuana."South Africans Arrest Carradine," Tuscaloosa News (September 21, 1980) p. 19 He was convicted and given a suspended sentence. He claimed that he had been framed by the apartheid government, as he had been seen dancing with Tina Turner.

During the 1980s, Carradine was arrested at least twice for driving under the influence of alcohol, once in 1984 and again in 1989. In the second case, Carradine pleaded no contest. Of this incident, the Los Angeles Times reported: "Legal experts say Carradine was handed a harsher-than-average sentence, even for a second-time offender: three years' summary probation, 48 hours in jail, 100 hours of community service, 30 days' work picking up trash for the California Department of Transportation, attendance at a drunk driving awareness meeting and completion of an alcohol rehabilitation program."

In 1994, in Toronto, filming Kung Fu: The Legend Continues, Carradine was arrested for kicking in a door at the SkyDome while attending a Rolling Stones concert. He later claimed that he was trying to avoid being swarmed by fans.

Death

David Carradine arrived in Bangkok, Thailand on May 31, 2009, to shoot his latest film, titled Stretch. He was last seen alive on June 3, but his assistant and other film staffers could not reach Carradine when they were going to have dinner and decided to leave without him. Carradine called the assistant an hour later but was told the group was across town and he would have to make his own arrangements that evening.

On June 4 (Thursday), at the age of 72, Carradine was found dead in his room at the Swissôtel Nai Lert Park Hotel, located on 2 Witthayu Road, in central Bangkok. Lt. Teerapop Luanseng, Lt. Col. Pirom Jantrapirom, and Col. Somprasong Yenthuam, Superintendent of the nearby Lumphini Police Station (139 Witthayu Road), said that Carradine was found naked and had hanged himself in the room's closet with a curtain cord. Police said he had been dead for at least 12 hours and found no sign of struggle.  Thai police suggested the death might have been from accidental suffocation due to auto-erotic asphyxiation, since there was no suicide note and he was found with a rope tied to both his neck and his genitals. Thai authorities conducted the first autopsy on Carradine shortly after his death, and stated on June 8 that it would take a month to determine how he died, although a Thai police colonel told Reuters that the likely cause was asphyxiation. On July 1, 2009, Michael Baden, the medical examiner hired by Carradine's family to conduct his own autopsy on Carradine, stated that the actor died from asphyxiation, and that the way Carradine's body was bound allowed him to rule out suicide.

Filmography

Awards and honors
David Carradine was neither nominated nor won a Tony Award for The Royal Hunt of the Sun. However, he was a participating artist at the 28th Annual Tony Awards, 1974.

 1966: Winner – Theatre World Award, for The Royal Hunt of the Sun 1973: Nominee – Primetime Emmy Award. Outstanding Continued Performance by an Actor in a Leading Role (Drama Series - Continuing), for Kung Fu 1974: Nominee – Golden Globe Awards. Best Television Actor - Drama Series, for Kung Fu 1974: Winner – TP de Oro, Spain. Mejor actor extranjero (Best Foreign Actor), por Kung Fu 1974: Nominee – TP de Oro, Spain. Personaje más popular (Most Popular Character), por Kung Fu 1976: Winner – National Board of Review Award. Best Actor, for Bound for Glory 1976: Nominee – New York Film Critics Circle Award. Best Actor, for Bound for Glory 1977: Nominee – Golden Globe Awards. Best Actor - Motion Picture Drama, for Bound for Glory 1986: Nominee – Golden Globe Awards. Best Supporting Actor - Television, for North and South 1997: Honoree – Gold Star on the Hollywood Walk of Fame, Television
 1998: Honoree – Golden Boot Award (along with brothers Keith and Robert)
 2004: Winner – The Golden Schmoes award. Best Supporting Actor, for Kill Bill (V2) 2004: Honoree – Capri, Hollywood International Film Festival, Capri Legend Award.
 2005: Winner – Saturn Award. Best Supporting Actor, for Kill Bill: Volume 2 2005: Nominee – Golden Globe Awards. Best Supporting Actor - Motion Picture, for Kill Bill (Vol.2) 2005: Winner – EW.com Award – Annual prize bestowed on deserving Golden Globe nominees, for Kill Bill - Vol.2 2005: Nominee – 31º People’s Choice Awards. Favorite Villain Movie Star, for Bill in Kill Bill - Vol. 2. 2005: Nominee – Gold Derby award. Supporting Actor, for Bill in Kill Bill, Volume 2 2005: Nominee – Satellite Award, Best Supporting Actor - Drama, for Kill Bill: Volume 2 2005: Nominee – Online Film & Television Association, OFTA Awards. Best Supporting Actor, for Kill Bill, Vol. 2 2005: Nominee – Online Film Critics Society Awards 2004. Best Supporting Actor, for Kill Bill: Volume 2 2005: Winner – Action on Film International Film Festival, Lifetime Achievement Award - First annual recipient
 2005: Nominee – Albo d’oro, Italian Online Movie Awards (IOMA). Miglior attore non protagonista (Best Supporting Actor), per Kill Bill volume 2 2008: Honoree – Bronze plaque on the Walk of Western Stars 
 2010: Mención especial del jurado (Special Mention by the Jury) – Fancine - Festival de Cine Fantástico de la Universidad de Málaga (Málaga International Week of Fantastic Cinema), por Kandisha
 2013: Honoree – Hollywood Museum, Exhibition “The Barefoot Legend: David Carradine - a Contemporary Renaissance Man”
 2014: Inductee – Martial Arts History Museum, Hall of Fame

Bibliography
  (See Shaolin Kung Fu)
  Co-authored with David Nakahara. (Alternate transliteration of "T'ai Chi" is T'ai chi ch'uan)
  (Autobiography)
  Co-authored with David Nakahara.  
   Co-authored with David Nakahara. (Alternate transliteration is Qigong) 
  Compilation of 19 articles published as a regular section in the magazine Inside Kung Fu, from November 2003 onwards.
 

Discography
 
 
 
 
 
 
 
 
 
 
 

Notes

References

External links

 
 
 
 
 
 
 
 David Carradine at TV Guide
 2003 Interview by Hikari Takano, recorded at Mr. Carradine’s home
 2004 Onion interview
 2004 IGN interview with David Carradine
 2004, "A Fresh Thing": David Carradine David Carradine – The Daily Telegraph'' obituary
 McLellan, Dennis. "David Carradine dies at 72; star of 'Kung Fu'," Los Angeles Times, Friday, June 5, 2009.

1936 births
2009 deaths
Deaths by autoerotic asphyxiation
20th-century American male actors
21st-century American male actors
Accidental deaths in Thailand
American male film actors
Film producers from California
American people of Irish descent
American male television actors
American male voice actors
American television directors
Television personalities from Los Angeles
Television producers from California
American wushu practitioners
Burials at Forest Lawn Memorial Park (Hollywood Hills)
Carradine family
Deaths by hanging
Deaths from asphyxiation
Film directors from California
Male actors from Hollywood, Los Angeles
Male actors from Oakland, California
Male actors from San Francisco
Male Western (genre) film actors
Military personnel from California
People from Greater Los Angeles
Polydor Records artists
San Francisco State University alumni
United States Army personnel who were court-martialed
Western (genre) television actors